Christians in Nigeria comprise an estimated 49.3% of the population. Christians are dominant in the southern (south-east/south-south/South west and central region in Nigeria. According to the Pew Research Center, Nigeria has the largest Christian population of any country in Africa, with more than 80 million persons in Nigeria belonging to the church with various denominations. The majority of Christians in Nigeria are Protestant.

Denominations

Figures in the most recent edition of The World Christian Encyclopedia (Johnson and Zurlo 2020) draw on figures assembled and updated as part of the World Christian Database (WCD); these put those who identify as Christians on 46.3%, and Muslims on 46.2 and ‘ethnic religions’ on 7.2%.

Statistics

Roman Catholicism in Nigeria 

The Catholic Church has an increase of followers in Nigeria.  In 2005, there were an estimated 19 million baptised Catholics in Nigeria. The Archdioceses of the Roman Catholic Church are Abuja, Benin City, Calabar, Ibadan, Jos, Kaduna, Lagos, Onitsha, and Owerri.
Cardinal Francis Arinze is a Roman Catholic Cardinal from Nigeria.

Anglican Church of Nigeria 
The ecclesiastical provinces of the Church of Nigeria are Lagos, Ibadan, Ondo, Edo, The Niger, Niger Delta, Owerri, Abuja, Kaduna, and Jos. Its primate is Nicholas Dikeriehi Orogodo Okoh.  The Church of Nigeria claims about 18 million members with an estimated 2 million members being active.

The Apostolic Church Nigeria 
The Apostolic Church Nigeria is a Pentecostal Christian denomination in Nigeria, affiliated with the Apostolic Church. Its headquarters is in Lagos. It has 4.5 million members.

Assemblies of God 
The General Council of the Assemblies of God Nigeria has its origins in the Nigerian Church of Jesus Christ and a partnership with the Assemblies of God USA in 1934. The council was founded in 1964. It had 16,300 churches and 3.6 million members as of 2019.

Church of Christ in Nigeria 
The Church of Christ in Nations (COCIN), formerly Church of Christ in Nigeria, is a Christian denomination in Nigeria. It was founded in 1904. Its headquarters is in Jos, Plateau State. It used to have the name of Ekklesiyar Kristi A Nigeria. It is estimated to have over 8,000,000 members.

Evangelical Church Winning All 
The Evangelical Church Winning All has about 6000 congregations and 6 million members. It was founded by SIM, a missions organization established in Nigeria in 1893.

Evangelical Reformed Church of Christ 
The Evangelical Reformed Church of Christ was formed in Nasarawa State on 8 July 1916. The church has approximately 1.5 million members.

Lutheran Church of Christ in Nigeria 
The Lutheran Church of Christ in Nigeria (LCCN) is a major Lutheran denomination in Nigeria, a member of the Lutheran World Federation (LWF). It was established as an independent church in 1913 from the Sudan United Mission, Danish Branch (SUMD), known today as Mission Afrika. The LCCN now has an estimated 2,200,000 members in over 2,400 congregations nationwide.

Methodist Church Nigeria 
The Methodist Church Nigeria is one of the largest Methodist denominations in the world and one of the largest Christian churches in Nigeria, with around two million members in 2000 congregations. It has seen exponential growth since the turn of the millennium.

Nigerian Baptist Convention 
The Nigerian Baptist Convention has about 6.5 million baptized members spread across the nation. The Baptist work was started by Thomas Jefferson Bowen in 1850. It currently has thirty five conferences in different ecclesiastical in Nigeria. It has its headquarter in Dugbe, Ibadan, Oyo State.

Presbyterian Church of Nigeria 
The Presbyterian Church of Nigeria has almost 4 million members in thousands of congregations mainly in Nigeria, but has regional Presbytery in Togo as well as in Benin. It was founded in the mid-1800s, by ministers of the Church of Scotland. It is a member of the World Communion of Reformed Churches.

Redeemed Christian Church of God 
The Redeemed Christian Church of God (RCCG) is a Pentecostal megachurch and denomination founded in Lagos, Nigeria. The General overseer (most senior pastor) is Enoch Adeboye, ordained in 1981. In 2008, it had 14,000 churches and 5 million members in Nigeria.

QIC-United Evangelical Church 
The QIC-United Evangelical Church (Founded as Qua Iboe Church) is a Christian denomination in Nigeria. It has existed since 1887.[1] It has more than 1,000 congregations and 2,000,000 members.

The Seventh-day Adventist Church 
The Seventh-day Adventist Church in Nigeria as of 2016 has close to 250,000 members throughout Nigeria divided into three different conferences.

Church of Jesus Christ of Latter-day Saints  

Within Nigeria, The Church of Jesus Christ of Latter-day Saints also has a growing presence. As of January 1, 2012, the church claims more than 100,000 members in the country and has established 315 congregations.

The church announced creation of new Owerri mission in Nigeria in 2016.

Other 

In 1970, 87,000 Jehovah's Witnesses were present in Nigeria, which grew to more than 360,000 by 2014.

The New Apostolic Church reports for 2016 300.000 members in 1.

Aladura is a classification of churches that abide by a Christian religious denomination or trend inspired by activities of progressive church elements, J.B Sadare, D.O. Odubanjo, I.O Sanya and others in 1918. The denomination has over 3 million adherents worldwide. The Aladura movement started at Ijebu-Ode, Nigeria in 1918. This movement later metamorphosed to Living Faith Church Worldwide (whose headquarters is the Faith Tabernacle) and to the Christ Apostolic Church. The Church of the Lord (Aladura) is an African Initiated Church founded by Josiah Olunowo Ositelu in 1925, and inaugurated in 1930 in Ogere Remo, Ogun State, Nigeria. Ositelu was born on 15 May 1900 at Ogere, ijebu-Remo, Ogun State in Nigeria.

Since the 1990s, there has been significant growth in many other churches, independently started in Africa by Africans, particularly the evangelical Protestant ones. These includes the mostly charismatic and Pentecostal denominations such as Mountain of Fire and Miracles, Christ Embassy, Streams of Joy International,  Celestial Church of Christ and Dominion City. These churches have further many millions of members and followers in Nigeria.

National Church of Nigeria, Abuja 
      
The National Church of Nigeria (previously known as the Nigerian Ecumenical Centre and officially known as the National Christian Centre) is a non-denominational church building of the Christian Association of Nigeria, the umbrella body of many of Nigeria's Christian denominations. The church is located in Abuja.

See also

Islam in Nigeria
National Church of Nigeria
Nigerian sectarian violence
Protestantism in Nigeria
Roman Catholicism in Nigeria
List of notable pastors in Nigeria
Statewise

Christianity in Adamawa State
Christianity in Borno State
Christianity in Kaduna State
Christianity in Kano State
Christianity in Ogun State
Christianity in Osun State

References